Carl A. Pfeiffer GmbH & Co. KG is a German piano-manufacturing company in Leonberg, Böblingen (district).

History

The company was established in 1861 in Stuttgart, Germany by Joseph Anton Pfeiffer. In 1912, the company was renamed as the Carl A. Pfeiffer company and in 1994, the company moved to is current location in Leonberg.

Current models

References

External links 

 Official homepage

Piano manufacturing companies of Germany
Manufacturing companies based in Stuttgart
German companies established in 1861
Böblingen (district)